Xerosecta giustii is a species of small air-breathing land snail, a terrestrial pulmonate gastropod mollusk in the family Geomitridae, the hairy snails and their allies. 

This species is endemic to Italy. 

Their shell is colored grey to whitish grey with dark reddish brown apex (end).  There can be weak and thin interrupted brown bands.  The animal is yellowish grey with a pale grey head and neck.  The maximum size is 1 inch.  Their diet consists of open Mediterranean shrub land vegetation, on the soil and under stones, also on branches of bushes and grass stems.  There is only one known population that occupies an area of not more than 100 x 100 m.  They are threatened by habitat destruction.

References

 Manganelli, G. & Favilli, L. (1996). Xerosecta giustii a new hygromiid from Tuscany (Italy) close to extinction (Gastropoda, Pulmonata: Helicoidea). Journal of Conchology. 35 (4): 335-355
 Bank, R. A.; Neubert, E. (2017). Checklist of the land and freshwater Gastropoda of Europe. Last update: July 16th, 2017

External links

Geomitridae
Endemic fauna of Italy
Gastropods described in 1996
Taxonomy articles created by Polbot